Flacey-en-Bresse (literally Flacey in Bresse) is a commune in the Saône-et-Loire department in the region of Bourgogne-Franche-Comté in eastern France.

Geography
The Vallière forms part of the commune's north-western border.

Notable people from Flacey-en-Bresse
Peter Pernin Missionary, survivor and memoirist of the Peshtigo fire

See also
Communes of the Saône-et-Loire department

References

Communes of Saône-et-Loire